Filth Rations is an extended play by the American grindcore band Trap Them. It was released on June 1, 2010, through Southern Lord Records. Filth Rations was described by Blow the Scene as "a tasty appetizer" for the group's follow-up release, Darker Handcraft. Jason Heller of The A.V. Club added the EP to his best of 2010 list.

Track listing
 "Day 38: Carnage Incarnate" – 3:27
 "Day 39: Degenerate Binds" – 3:31
 "Day 40: Dead Fathers Wading In the Bodygrounds" – 5:10
 "Day 7: Digital Dogs with Analog Collars" – 1:49

Personnel
Trap Them
 Brian Izzi – guitar
 Stephen LaCour – bass guitar
 Chris Maggio – drum kit
 Ryan McKenney – vocals

References

External links
 Filth Rations artwork by Vberkvlt

2010 EPs
Southern Lord Records albums
Trap Them albums
Albums produced by Kurt Ballou